Dance or Die EP is an EP by the crunk rock band Family Force 5 to give fans a preview of their next album which was released on August 19, 2008.

Track listing

Credits
 Soul Glow Activatur – vocals, guitar
 Jacob Olds – drums, vocals
 Joshua Olds – bass, vocals
 Nathan Currin – keytar, drum machine, turntables, vocals, tambourine, percussion
 Derek Mount – lead guitar

References

2008 EPs
Family Force 5 albums